The men's light heavyweight (81 kilograms) event at the 2002 Asian Games took place from 7 to 13 October 2002 at Masan Gymnasium, Masan, South Korea.

Schedule
All times are Korea Standard Time (UTC+09:00)

Results 
Legend
RET — Won by retirement
RSCO — Won by referee stop contest outclassed

References

External links
Official website

91